The Oberheim DS-2 is a pre-MIDI digital music sequencer. Designed and built in 1974 by Tom Oberheim, it is considered one of the first ever digital musical sequencers.

Features

The DS-2 is capable of storing and sequencing 48 notes and provides a single channel of CV/Gate input and output. It can also be clocked externally. A later model, the DS-2a was capable of storing up to 144 notes.

References

External links

Music sequencers
Oberheim synthesizers